Hilary, Hilarie or Hillary is a given and family name, derived from the Latin hilarius meaning "cheerful", from hilaris, "cheerful, merry", which comes from the Greek ἱλαρός (hilaros), "cheerful, merry", which in turn comes from ἵλαος (hilaos), "propitious, gracious". Ilaria is the popular Italian feminine form, while Ilario is the Italian masculine one. Other male forms are Hilarion, Ilarion, and Illarion.

Notable men with the given name
 Hilary the Deacon ( century), churchman and theologian
 Pope Hilarius or Hilary (died 468), Catholic pope and saint
 Hilary of Arles, 5th-century bishop and saint
 Hilary of Chichester (c. 1110–1169), bishop of Chichester
 Hilary of Galeata, 6th century hermit 
 Hilary of Poitiers or Saint Hilarius, 4th-century bishop and Church Father
 Hilary Benn (born 1953), British politician
 Hillary Bor (born 1989), Kenyan-American athlete
 Hillary Butler (born 1971), American football player
 Hilary Davan Wetton (born 1943), British conductor
 Hillary "Hilly" Hathaway (born 1969), American baseball player
 Hilary A. Herbert (1834–1919), American politician
 Hilary Jenkinson (1882–1961), British archivist and archival theorist
 Hilary R. W. Johnson (1837–1901), 11th President of Liberia
 Hilary Jones (disambiguation), multiple people
 Hilary Knight (born 1926), author, illustrator
 Hillary Makasa (born 1976), Zambian footballer
 Hilary Marquand (1901−1972), British politician
 Hillary Menard (born 1934), Canadian ice hockey player
 Hilary Minster (1944–1999), British actor
 Hilary Minc (1905−1974), Polish economist and politician
 Hilary Putnam (1926−2016), American philosopher
 Hilary Skarżyński (1925–1987), Polish ice hockey player
 Hillary Waugh (1920–2008), American novelist
 Hillary Yego (born 1992), Kenyan steeplechase runner
 Hilary Hinton Ziglar or Zig Ziglar (1926–2012), motivational speaker

Notable women with the given name
 Hilary (musician) (1950–2007), American singer-songwriter
 Hilary Armstrong (born 1945), British politician
 Hilary Bell (disambiguation), multiple people
 Hilary Bok (born 1950), American academic and writer
 Hilary Bonner (born 1950), British writer
 Hillary Brooke (1914–1999), American actress
 Hilarie Burton (born 1982), American actress/producer
 Hillary Carlip (born 1956), American novelist
 Hillary Rodham Clinton (born 1947), American senator and Secretary of State 2009–2013
 Hilary Cruz (born 1988), American actress, model and beauty queen
 Hilary Devey (1957–2022), English businesswoman and television personality
 Hilary du Pré (born 1942), British musician
 Hilary Duff (born 1987), American actress and singer
 Hilary Hahn (born 1979), American violinist
 Hillary Howard, American reporter
 Hilary Knight (born 1989), American ice hockey player
 Hilarie Lindsay (1922–2021), Australian toy manufacturer and writer 
 Hillary Lindsey, country music songwriter
 Hilarie Mais (born 1952), British/Australian artist
 Hilary Mantel (1952–2022), British novelist
 Hilary D. Marston, American physician-scientist and global health policy advisor
 Hilaree Nelson (1972–2022), American ski mountaineer
 Hilary Ockendon, British mathematician
 Hilary Pecis (born 1979), American artist
 Hilary B. Price (born 1969), creator of the comic strip Rhymes with Orange
 Hillary Raphael (born 1976), American novelist
 Hilary Rhoda (born 1987), American model
 Hillary Scholten (born 1982), American politician
 Hillary Scott (born 1986), American singer-songwriter
 Hillary Scott, (born 1983) American pornographic actress
 Hilarie Sidney, American musician
 Hillary B. Smith (born 1957), American actress
 Hilary Swank (born 1974), American actress
 Hilary Swarts, American wildlife biologist 
 Hillary Tuck (born 1978), American actress
 Hilary Van Dyke (born 1970), American actress and singer
 Hillary Wolf (born 1977), American child actress

People with this family name
 Darius Hillary (born 1993), American football player
 Edmund Hillary (1919–2008), New Zealand mountaineer
 Jennifer Hilary (1942–2008), British actress
 Lynn Hilary (born 1982), Irish singer and guitarist
 Patrick Hillery (1923–2008), President of Ireland
 Peter Hillary (born 1954), Sir Edmund's son, New Zealand adventurer
 Richard Hillary (1919−1943), Australian/British fighter pilot and author
 William Hillary (1771–1847), Founder of the Royal National Lifeboat Institution

Fictional characters
 Hillary, a recurring character in the TV series Kyle XY
 Hilary Banks, in the TV series The Fresh Prince of Bel-Air
 Hilary Becker, a captain in the TV series Primeval
 Hilary Briss, part of the comedy quartet The League of Gentlemen
Hilary Burde, the first-person narrator of Iris Murdoch's A Word Child
 Hilary Curtis in the soap opera The Young and the Restless
 Hillary Norm Peterson, in the TV series Cheers
 Hilary Tachibana, in the Beyblade anime series
 Hillary Whitney, protagonist in the 1988 movie Beaches, played by Barbara Hershey

See also
 Saint Hilaria, daughter of Roman Emperor Zeno and saint in the Eastern Christian churches
 Hilary (disambiguation)
 Saint-Hilaire (disambiguation)
 Ilar and Eleri, Welsh forms of this name

References

Surnames
English-language unisex given names
English-language feminine given names
English-language masculine given names
English unisex given names
English feminine given names
English masculine given names
Unisex given names
Feminine given names
Masculine given names